Espira-de-Conflent (literally Espira of Conflent) is a commune in the Pyrénées-Orientales department in southern France.

Geography

Localisation 
Espira-de-Conflent is located in the canton of Le Canigou and in the arrondissement of Prades.

Population 

The inhabitants of the commune are known as Espiranois(es).

See also
Communes of the Pyrénées-Orientales department

References

Communes of Pyrénées-Orientales